Nikolskoye Airport  is an airport on Bering Island, Russia located four kilometers southeast of Nikolskoye, Kamchatka Krai. It is the only airfield on the Commander Islands.  The airport has no significant military use.

Airlines and destinations

References
RussianAirFields.com

Airports built in the Soviet Union
Airports in Kamchatka Krai
Commander Islands